Thak may refer to:
 Thak, a village in Kumaon division, Uttarakhand, India
 Thak man-eater, a man-eating tiger that operated around the village in Kumaon
 Zakary Thaks, a garage band in Texas